Co-Wheels is a car club operator which claims to have the largest car club fleet in the United Kingdom. It is financed by the Chinese manufacturer SAIC. Co-Wheels was founded in 2008 and now has 450 vehicles in 45 UK towns and cities.Co-Wheels https://site-co-wheels-live.s3.amazonaws.com/media/Co%20Wheels%20Impact%20Report%202021%20FINAL.pdf

Vehicles
Their vehicles include the MG ZS and MG 5 which are both SAIC products, and electric vehicles such as the Renault Zoe.

References

Carsharing